The Straits is an Australian television drama series for ABC1 filmed in Cairns, the Torres Strait Islands and other Far North Queensland locations.

The series is based on an idea by actor Aaron Fa'aoso and produced by Penny Chapman and Helen Panckhurst from Matchbox Pictures. It is directed by Peter Andrikidis, Rachel Ward, and Rowan Woods. It is written by Louis Nowra, Blake Ayshford, Nick Parsons, Kristen Dunphy, and Jaime Browne. On 19 October 2012, it was announced that a second series will not be produced.

In December 2012, the show began airing exclusively on Hulu.

Synopsis
The series follows the Montebello family, whose business involves smuggling drugs into Australia, and guns and exotic wildlife out, making use of ties of blood and loyalty in the Torres Strait Islands. When Harry Montebello, the head of the family, starts to plan his succession, he sparks a vicious family power struggle. While under attack from ambitious bikers and mercurial Papua New Guinea Raskol gangs, the family must hold together through torture, assassination, and imprisonment.

Cast 

 Brian Cox as Harry Montebello
 Rena Owen as Kitty Montebello
 Aaron Fa'aoso as Noel Montebello
 Firass Dirani as Gary Montebello
 Jimi Bani as Marou Montebello
 Suzannah Bayes-Morton as Sissi Montebello
 Emma Lung as Lola
 Kate Jenkinson as Antoinette
 Cramer Cain as Eddie
 Andy Anderson as Vince
 Kim Gyngell as Paddy
 Rachael Blake as Natasha
 James Mackay as Joel Thomson
 Jasper Bagg as Two Stroke
 Dan Wyllie as Jojo
 Big Stu, the thug killed in the shark tank.

Episodes
(Episode information retrieved from Australian Television Information Archive).

References

External links
 
 Official website

Australian drama television series
2012 Australian television series endings
2012 Australian television series debuts
Australian Broadcasting Corporation original programming
Television shows set in Queensland
Television series by Matchbox Pictures